John Simon Ritchie (10 May 1957 – 2 February 1979), better known by his stage name Sid Vicious, was an English musician, best known as the bassist for the punk rock band Sex Pistols. Despite dying in 1979 at age 21, he remains an icon of the punk subculture; one of his friends noted that he embodied "everything in punk that was dark, decadent and nihilistic."

Early life
John Simon Ritchie was born on 10 May 1957 in Lewisham to John and Anne Ritchie nee McDonald (1933–1996). Anne had dropped out of school and joined the British Army, where she met Ritchie's father, a guardsman at Buckingham Palace and a semi-professional trombone player on the London jazz scene. Shortly after Ritchie's birth, he and his mother moved to Ibiza, where they expected to be joined by his father, who did not appear and provided no financial support—Anne reportedly sold marijuana to get by. With the help of the British Embassy in Spain, Anne returned to England and settled in Tunbridge Wells, Kent, where she enrolled her son known as John in Sandown Court School (now The Skinners' Kent Academy).

In 1965, Anne married Christopher Beverley, who died six months later of kidney failure. Anne and John lived briefly in  Bristol and Clevedon, Somerset. In 1971, the pair moved to Stoke Newington in Hackney, east London, where John attended Clissold Park School (now Stoke Newington School). At this time, he began using the name 'John Beverley'.

By 1973, Anne's life was consumed by her addiction to heroin and opiates, to the point where she was unaware that her son was attending Westminster Kingsway College, then known as Kingsway College of Further Education and as a community and vocational school for students with difficulties. While at Kingsway—which he was likely attending to complete his 'O Levels' (GCE Ordinary Level), John indicated to a counsellor that he was contemplating suicide; there were also claims that he was torturing and killing cats. When John turned 16 that year, Anne kicked him out of her home.

In 1973, Beverley met fellow Kingsway student John Lydon, who introduced him to his friends John Grey and John Wardle. All four, who became known locally as 'The Four Johns', quit school and began squatting in various dismal locations. Three of the four Johns would then take nicknames: Lydon nicknamed Beverley "Sid Vicious" after Beverley was bitten by Lydon's hamster Sid (named after Syd Barrett). Lydon's bandmate, guitarist Steve Jones gave him the name Johnny Rotten, and Sid nicknamed Wardle Jah Wobble.

The four young men started hanging around the King's Road in Chelsea, London which, at the time, was the epicentre of 'Swinging London', when music and fashion were burgeoning. A favourite spot was Malcolm McLaren and Vivienne Westwood's clothing store, SEX. There, Vicious met American expatriate Chrissie Hynde, before she formed her group the Pretenders, who reportedly tried (and failed) to convince Vicious to join her in a sham marriage so she could get a work permit. According to Lydon, he and Vicious took up busking, with Lydon singing and occasionally playing the violin and Vicious playing a tambourine or an acoustic guitar. They would play Alice Cooper covers, and people gave them money to stop.

In 1975, Lydon joined Jones, Glen Matlock and Paul Cook in the formation of the band the Sex Pistols, managed by McLaren—Vicious was photographed watching the band attack their audience at the Nashville Rooms in Kensington in 1976. Vicious then began his musical career.

The Flowers of Romance and Siouxsie and the Banshees (1976) 
In 1976, Vicious co-founded, as vocalist and saxophone player, the Flowers of Romance along with the Clash co-founder Keith Levene and Viv Albertine, who would go on to become the guitarist of The Slits. During this time, he learned to play bass by listening to the first Ramones album Ramones,  fixating on the up-tempo bump-and-grind pattern of the song "I Don't Wanna Go Down to the Basement", a pattern he would apply to most of his playing from then on.

In June 1976, Vicious went to a Sex Pistols concert at the 100 Club. Nick Kent, who had played guitar with the Sex Pistols early on and had left music to become an NME music critic and champion of punk rock (and who was Hynde's boyfriend), was also there, and was apparently blocking Vicious' view. Vicious, high on speed, lashed Kent's head with a rusted motorcycle chain which, according to Hynde, he carried with him. The incident was reported in the papers but no charges were laid.

Although the songs they wrote would later be performed by other bands, The Flowers of Romance did not perform live, or record any music. But Vicious came to the attention of members of The Damned. He was considered, along with Dave Vanian, for the position of lead singer, but Vicious failed to show for the audition. Vicious contended that Vanian and his associates had intentionally withheld information about the audition to ensure that Vicious missed the audition.

On 20 September 1976, Vicious appeared with Siouxsie and the Banshees, playing drums at their first gig at the 100 Club Punk Special in London's Oxford Street, a two-day festival co-founded by McLaren. The following day, Vicious went to The Damned's performance. Drunk and high on amphetamines, he hurled his glass at the stage, attempting to strike Vanian. He missed, the glass shattered against a pillar and blinded a woman in one eye. Vicious was arrested and imprisoned at Ashford Remand Centre. Westwood and Albertine visited Vicious in prison, with Albertine bringing the book Helter Skelter as a gift.

Sex Pistols (1977–1978) 

In February 1977, McLaren announced that Glen Matlock had been "thrown out of the band" because "he liked the Beatles", and that he had been replaced by Vicious. In his autobiography I Was a Teenage Sex Pistol, Matlock says he quit because he was "sick of all the bullshit". In the 2000 documentary The Filth and the Fury, the band members agreed that there was tension between Matlock and Rotten, but Matlock says that those tensions were aggravated by McLaren, who wanted to generate chaos in the band as a creative mechanism, and as a way of building the band's image. He wanted Matlock to leave, and to replace him with Vicious, saying "if Johnny Rotten is the voice of punk, then Vicious is the attitude."

Vicious had become the Sex Pistols' uber-fan, never missing a concert. He was encouraged to be drunk and disorderly, with Wobble saying "Sid was offered up as a sacrificial lamb by the people around the Pistols. None of them would have gone over the top. He was their kamikaze pilot, and they were all too happy to strap him in and send him off."

In March 1977, the Sex Pistols were signed to A&M Records. In celebration, they trashed the company's offices, and then held a private party at the Speakeasy, a club and restaurant frequented by established members of the London music scene. The Sex Pistols members confronted the BBC DJ Bob Harris, who was the presenter of the Old Grey Whistle Test, a television show which featured non-chart music. Blocking Harris behind the bar, broken bottles in hand, they demanded to know when they would be on the show. A bar fight ensued. Sid Vicious jammed a broken bottle into the face of BBC recording engineer George Nicholson. Harris was rescued by the Procol Harum road crew, who grouped around him and escorted him out of the club, where they found that police had had to cordon off the entire block. None of the Sex Pistols were arrested but, the next day, A&M dropped them and Capital Radio banned all Sex Pistols music from its stations.

Vicious played his first gig with the Sex Pistols on 3 April 1977 at The Screen On The Green; his debut was filmed by Don Letts and appears in Punk Rock Movie. But he could not play well and had no bass experience, so guitarist Steve Jones played bass on the band's debut album Never Mind the Bollocks, Here's the Sex Pistols. Vicious was allowed to play bass on one track, "Bodies" but his contribution was later overdubbed by Jones. He also missed most of the band's rehearsals and recording sessions because he was in hospital with hepatitis, likely caused by intravenous drug use. By this time, Vicious was using heroin, with many believing that his mother was his supplier. Dee Dee Ramone had seen him shooting drugs on more than one occasion, and Rotten's friend John Gray had found Vicious shooting speed while he was still living with his mother; Vicious told him that the drugs were "me mum's".

Also in 1977, Vicious met Nancy Spungen, an American groupie living in London, who had a history of psychological problems and was also a heroin addict. Spungen, who had initially set her sights on Rotten and who supported herself by alternately dealing drugs and working as a topless dancer, made herself useful on the King's Road scene by procuring drugs for musicians. She and Vicious became inseparable, which caused problems with the band, whose members did not like her; McLaren admitted to planning to have her abducted and forced onto a plane back to the United States. The two had a strange relationship; Vicious played nursemaid when she was sick and was shy and polite with her mother, who reported watching Nancy cut his meat for him. On the other hand, Spungen was known to be verbally abusive and physically aggressive. Vicious may have facilitated Spungen's occasional prostitution (and watched). According to Rotten's wife Nora Forster, Vicious often hit Nancy and, in her last conversation with her mother, Spungen admitted that beatings which she had previously said were at the hands of strangers actually came from Vicious. They shared an infatuation with knives.

Beginning in July, with Spungen in tow, the band went on a Scandinavian tour, then toured Holland and the UK. On 28 October 1977, their only album Never Mind the Bollocks, Here's the Sex Pistols was released and, due in part to notoriety (particularly of the song "God Save the Queen"), and in spite of sales bans at major retailers, the album debuted at number one on the UK Album Charts and went gold on 17 November. It remained a best-seller for nearly a year, spending 48 weeks in the top 75. It is frequently listed as the most influential punk album of all time.

On 24 December 1977, the Sex Pistols played The Royal Links Pavilion, Cromer; the next day, the band played two shows at Ivanhoes in Huddersfield, West Yorkshire. It was during the national Fire Brigades Strike and the band performed a matinee for the children of firefighters. In the 2013 documentary Never Mind the Baubles: Xmas '77 with the Sex Pistols, Lydon claimed that Vicious had to be warned not to be the "hardcore, tough rocker bloke" in front of the children. The track of Vicious singing the Johnny Thunders song "Born to Lose" which appears on Sid Sings, was recorded during this performance, as Vicious stepped in when Lydon left the stage to pose as Father Christmas. These were the Sex Pistols' last performances in Britain, until the original members reunited for the Filthy Lucre tour in 1996.

In January 1978, the Sex Pistols embarked on a two-week US tour. There was rising tension within the band. Rotten was barely speaking to anyone. Warner Bros., which organised and staffed the tour, insisted that Vicious clean up his heroin habit so he was using methadone. He was in a constant state of semi-withdrawal and furious that the band had blocked Spungen from accompanying them on the tour. McLaren had long been keeping Vicious on rations of $14.00 (US) a week but he still managed to find drugs. To make matters worse, McLaren, ever eager for more chaos and careful that journalists were on-scene, booked the band, not into the clubs of New York, but into bars in Louisiana, Georgia, Tennessee, and Texas. In San Antonio on 8 January, Vicious felt antagonised by an audience member and struck him on the head with his bass. Before the Sex Pistols took the stage of the Longhorn Ballroom in Dallas on 10 January, Vicious carved the words "gimme a fix" into his chest with a razor (later joking that "if you try to kill yourself [with a razor to the chest], it won't work"). He greeted the audience by calling them "cowboy faggots"; in return, he was struck by a full can of beer to the head. The next night, 11 January, he punched a hole in the Green Room wall after the band’s show at Cain's Ballroom in Tulsa. It was long rumoured that at their 14 January show at the Winterland Ballroom in San Francisco, Vicious did not bother to plug in his bass at all, although video from the show makes it clear when Jones' guitar cuts out during "Bodies" that Sid was both playing bass and the right notes. There is also a pre-show soundcheck audio recording where Johnny says to turn Sid down because his bass was too loud. At the end of the show, Johnny Rotten uttered the famous quote "Ever get the feeling you've been cheated?", marking the end of the Sex Pistols.

Post-Sex Pistols 
On 19 January, Vicious boarded a flight from San Francisco to New York. By the time the plane landed at JFK Airport, he had slipped into a diazepam-, methadone- and alcohol-induced coma and was rushed to a hospital in Queens where, as he told the photographer Roberta Bayley, the doctor told him that if he did not quit drinking, he would be dead in six months.

When he was released, he re-united with Spungen. In April, the two travelled to Paris to film the Sex Pistols mockumentary The Great Rock 'n' Roll Swindle, where they spent most of their time in their hotel room, doing drugs. Director Julien Temple was able to get Vicious to attend production long enough to record three songs: "C'Mon Everybody", "Something Else" and "My Way". When Vicious returned to his hotel, he found that Spungen had retaliated for being left alone by (superficially) cutting her wrists.

The couple then travelled to London where, by August, they needed to return to the US but had no money. He bumped into Glen Matlock, who by this point had founded the band Rich Kids, and suggested that they play a gig together. For this concert, Vicious and Matlock recruited Rich Kids guitarist and singer Steve New, and the Damned's drummer Rat Scabies. They called themselves Vicious White Kids and performed once—at the Electric Ballroom in Camden Town on 15 August 1978. Sid did not play bass in this band; he was the lead singer. Spungen joined on backing vocals but Matlock made sure that her microphone was not plugged in for the concert.

Vicious and Spungen then returned to New York, where they settled into Room 100 of the Hotel Chelsea, after causing a fire in their first room, as Mr. and Mrs. John Ritchie. Spungen acted as his manager, putting together the band of Steve Dior, Jerry Nolan and Arthur Kane and booking him into the New York club Max's Kansas City. Spungen sang with him, and they were sometimes joined by Mick Jones and Johnny Thunders. He drew large crowds, though some performances were "hellish", with the audience booing his attempted imitation of Rotten, and Vicious insulting the audience. Examples of this can be heard in the in-between tracks on his live album Sid Sings; these performances were also released in 2002 (and again in 2011), as Live at Max's Kansas City, NY 1978. In the documentary Who Killed Nancy?, Dior said that Vicious "got good money for those shows" but Spungen often had to call her parents for money. In one of these conversations, Spungen said that she was having problems with her kidneys, and asked her mother to look into getting her, and Sid, into a detox programme.

Death of Nancy Spungen 

On the night of 11 October 1978, Sid and Nancy hosted a party in their hotel room, during which Vicious took approximately 30 Tuinal tablets and, while numerous people came and went, was comatose for the rest of the night. At about 11:00 the next morning, hotel staff found Spungen dead on the bathroom floor, with a knife wound to her abdomen. Vicious was found wandering the hallway. He first claimed to have killed her, then said he remembered nothing. Two people who had been at the party stated that Nancy was alive at 5:00 a.m. The murder weapon was identified as a Jaguar K-11 hunting knife, which Nancy had purchased for Sid a few days earlier. Vicious was arrested and charged with second-degree murder. He told police that he and Nancy had argued that night but gave conflicting versions of what happened next, saying, "I stabbed her, but I never meant to kill her" then saying that he did not remember anything, then that Spungen had fallen onto the knife. Later, the arresting officer, Sgt Thomas Kilroy of the Third Homicide Unit, was quoted as having said: "After an investigation, Vicious admitted killing Miss Spungen during a dispute."

Lawyer Michael Berger first dealt with the matter, but McLaren and Anne Beverley were lawyer-shopping. They interviewed several high-profile lawyers, including Melvin Belli, Gerald B. Lefcourt and William Kunstler before settling on F. Lee Bailey. Bailey never appeared in court, but another lawyer from his firm, Jim Merberg, arranged for Vicious to be released on $50,000.00 bail, with the conditions that he not leave New York and that he sign in daily at the 3rd Homicide Unit offices, and at the Lafayette Street Methadone Center. All legal costs were paid by The Sex Pistols' label, Virgin Records. Vicious returned to the Chelsea Hotel, where he was joined by McLaren and his mother.

McLaren firmly believed that Vicious was innocent. Noting that the knife was left in plain view and that the couple kept their cash in a drawer, he believed that Spungen caught one of the party guests stealing money and was stabbed by that person. Given the number of people who had been through the hotel room on the night of the murder, Bailey had his investigator look into the possibility that a third party was involved in Spungen's death.

Bailey also hired forensic psychiatrist Dr. Stephen Teich to evaluate Vicious. After their initial conversation, during which Vicious was preoccupied by the 'working class in Berlin' and remained fixated on the television, Teich told Anne Beverley that Sid must not be left alone. Hours later, Beverley called Teich and said that Sid had slashed his arms with a smashed light bulb. Teich returned to the hotel and called an ambulance. EMS staff arrived with the police; when Sid saw them, he headed for the window but was blocked by Teich. He was taken to Bellevue Hospital and then moved to the New York-Presbyterian Westchester Behavioral Health Center in White Plains, New York. He was released on 26 November and returned to the Chelsea. At this time, Rotten tried to contact Vicious, but his calls were barred by Beverley and McLaren. On 28 November, Vicious was interviewed by the Irish journalist Bernard Clarke. He said that Spungen's death was "meant to happen" and that "Nancy always said she'd die before she was 21". He said that he just wanted to have fun. When asked where he would like to be, he replied, "Under the ground".

In the meantime, McLaren announced that the Sex Pistols would reunite to record a Christmas album to benefit Sid's defence, and sold T-shirts with the slogan, "She's Dead, I'm Alive, I'm Yours."

Assault on Todd Smith 
Vicious had started seeing women again and was casually involved with rocker Judy Nylon, Dee Dee Ramone's ex-girlfriend Connie Gripp, an aspiring actress named Michele Robison and Rotten's ex-girlfriend, Danielle Boothe. On 5 December, Vicious went to the Hurrah night club with Boothe, the photographers David Still and Peter Kodick Gravelle, and the comedian Michael Morra (aka Rockets Redglare) who was Sid's self-appointed bodyguard. Playing that night was Skafish; their drum roadie was a woman named Tarrah, who was the girlfriend of Todd Smith (Patti Smith's brother). Vicious began flirting with Tarrah. She rebuffed him and he pinched her. Smith told him to back off and Vicious smashed a beer bottle and jammed it into Smith's face. Smith required five stitches. Morra told police that Smith provoked Sid, that the bottle broke in Sid's hand and, producing the glass shards, said that Smith's wound was the accidental result of flying glass. On 7 December, Vicious was arrested and charged with assault. The judge agreed that Vicious had broken the terms of his previous bail and sent him to Rikers Island, where he underwent enforced detoxification. While he was in Rikers, Anne Beverley brought Robison to visit her son.

On 18 January, Vicious appeared in court, represented by Jim Merberg. To everyone's surprise, the judge, James Leff, not only released Vicious on $10,000.00 bail, but reduced his previous bail conditions—he now had to report to the Homicide Unit only three days a week and did not have to appear at the methadone centre at all. Leff applied one condition—that Vicious not frequent night clubs.

While it was widely reported, including by Rotten, that Mick Jagger paid Vicious' bail, that was untrue; Virgin Records continued to pay his legal fees. Anne Beverley, who was in court with Robison, was happy with the outcome, telling reporters "Now the public will know he is a good boy."

Death and aftermath 

On the morning of 1 February 1979, after completing his detoxification programme, Vicious was released from Rikers Island. When he arrived in Manhattan, and by chance, he met his friend Peter Gravelle. Vicious asked Gravelle to find him some heroin. Gravelle brought $200 worth of the drug to the apartment of Michele Robison at 63 Bank Street, where he joined Vicious, Robison, Beverley, Jerry Only and Howie Pyro. Gravelle said that they sat around doing drugs, and he left at 3:00 a.m. Only said that he and Anne Beverley made dinner, and that he left early, when the drug use began. He noted that Vicious was already nodding off, but Gravelle said that Robison gave Vicious four quaaludes to help him sleep. Vicious died in the night, of a drug overdose, Robison and his mother discovering his body the next morning.

In the 1996 book Please Kill Me: The Uncensored Oral History of Punk by Legs McNeil and Gillian McCain, Vicious' friend, photographer Eileen Polk, said that no New York funeral home was willing to hold a funeral or burial for Vicious due to his reputation. There is no evidence of this and the scenario is unlikely.

Anne Beverley claimed that Vicious and Spungen had made a suicide pact and that Vicious' death was not accidental. She produced a handwritten note, which she said she found in the pocket of Sid's leather jacket, reading "We had a death pact, and I have to keep my half of the bargain. Please bury me next to my baby. Bury me in my leather jacket, jeans and motorcycle boots. Goodbye." According to Deborah Spungen, Vicious wrote a letter to her when he was last hospitalised, saying approximately the same thing. "We always knew that we would go to the same place when we died", he wrote. "We so much wanted to die together in each other's arms. I cry every time I think about that. I promised my baby that I would kill myself if anything ever happened to her, and she promised me the same. This is my final commitment to my love." Spungen was Jewish, and is buried in a Jewish cemetery in Pennsylvania. As an inter-faith burial was not possible, Sid's body was cremated at Garden State Crematory in New Jersey. According to Polk, Beverley asked Deborah Spungen if she could scatter Vicious' ashes over Nancy's grave and Spungen said no. Regardless, Polk said that Jerry Only drove Beverley, her sister, and two of Vicious' friends, to Nancy's gravesite, where Beverley scattered Sid's ashes.  According to journalist, Alan G. Parker, before her death of a drug overdose in 1996, Beverley confessed to him that she intentionally injected her son with a fatal overdose of heroin, which Parker believes she did so that Vicious did not have to face the possibility of a lengthy prison sentence.

By the time of Sid's death, he and Nancy were internationally notorious. His death made the front pages of most New York newspapers for days, and Robison's apartment building was thronged by reporters. She would soon change her name. The first of many posthumous albums appeared in 1980; Sid Vicious, released by EMI sub-label Innocent Records, has as its jacket image the photo of Vicious' body being removed from 63 Bank St.

Fabricated stories about death

In his 2007 book Pretty Vacant: A History of Punk, director Phil Strongman stated his conviction that it was actor Michael Morra who killed Nancy Spungen, noting that it was Morra who brought the Tuinol to the party, and that Morra knew about the large amounts of cash kept in the bedside table drawer. Morra publicly denied this but privately confessed it to friends, however Howie Pyro insists that it was Morra's habit to tell stories for attention. (Morra died in 2001.) Strongman also implicated Morra's friend, punk rocker Neon Leon, who lived down the hall from Sid and Nancy and who was found to be in possession of many of Sid's belongings, including his famed leather jacket and two of his gold records. Leon said that Vicious had given the items to him for safe-keeping. He also told the Village Voice that he knew who the murderer was, although he refused to name the person.  Leon now performs under another name and lives outside the United States.

Legacy 
Several online sources state that the estate of Sid Vicious continues to earn approximately $400,000 annually in royalties. These statements are not verified. In Lonely Boy, Jones states that Vicious' estate passed to maternal cousins.

In a Rolling Stone article Green Day frontman Billie Joe Armstrong said of Vicious: "[He] was everything that's cool about punk rock: a skinny rocker who had a ton of attitude, sort of an Elvis, James Dean kind of guy".

In 2006, the Sex Pistols were inducted into the Rock and Roll Hall of Fame. The surviving members declined to attend the ceremony.

Anne Beverley had taken possession of Sid's bass guitar, a white Fender Precision Bass with a black Pickguard and a leather strap with the name 'Sid' etched into it. Shortly before her death she sold it to Steve Jones for £2,000.

Steven Severin of Siouxsie and the Banshees remembered Vicious in positive terms, saying "Before he got deeply into drugs, he was one of the funniest guys. He had a brilliant sense of humour, goofy, sweet, and very cute." In 2009, Lydon told The Independent "I'm sorry, God, for the day I brought Sid into the band. He felt so isolated, poor old Sid, because he wasn't the sharpest knife on the block. The best aspect of his character, which was his humour, just vanished the day he joined the Pistols."

On 20 January 2009, a 30-minute documentary about Sid Vicious titled In Search of Sid and recorded 30 years after his death by musician and long-term friend of Vicious Jah Wobble was aired on the BBC Radio 4.

Present day
As of 2022, Sid Vicious-themed souvenirs are widely available for purchase, and anything possibly having belonged to him fetches high prices. In 2011, a suit of Vicious sold at auction by Christie's for GBP 11,000.

Any recording with Vicious in it has been repeatedly released. His singles "My Way" and "It's Shit" were last released by the American label Cleopatra Records in 2021. Also in 2021, Cleopatra's sub-label, Anarchy Records, released the album Love Kills.

Music tributes 

Numerous bands have recorded songs about Sid Vicious. In 1979, the band Helpless Huw released the four-track recording Sid Vicious Was Innocent. In 1982, the Exploited included the song "Sid Vicious Was Innocent" on their album Troops of Tomorrow. Former frontman for the Clash, Joe Strummer, recorded "Love Kills" and "Dum Dum Club" for the Sid and Nancy soundtrack. In 1986, the Ramones released "Love Kills" on their album Animal Boy, which was a tribute to both Sid and Nancy. In 1994, NOFX released "Punk Guy" on their album Punk in Drublic, which makes references to a number of famous punk rock musicians. The line "Exudes a vicious disposition" is a Sid Vicious reference. In 2017, Foster the People released "Loyal Like Sid & Nancy", which references Vicious and Spungen's relationship, as the second single from their album Sacred Hearts Club. In 2015, Medusa released a music video to their song "Sid and Nancy" which portrays the two as children. In 2017, Industrial Metal band Powerman 5000 released a single called "Sid Vicious in a Dress," which is about a female punk rocker who exhibits similar chaos and violent nature of the former Sex Pistols bassist. In 2017, singer-songwriter Phoebe Bridgers recorded a track titled "Chelsea", included on her debut album Stranger in the Alps. The track was originally a poem about Vicious and Spungen's relationship in their final two months of life  Bridgers was so enthralled with the story, she turned it into a song.
In his 2022 album "Mainstream Sellout", artist Machine Gun Kelly released a track titled "Sid & Nancy", about a couple who was deeply in love but shared some dark ideas. The song ends with the sound of two consecutive gunshots.

Portrayals 
The critically-acclaimed 1986 film Sid and Nancy, directed by Alex Cox, portrays Sid's life from his joining the Sex Pistols to the end of his life. It stars Gary Oldman as Sid Vicious and Chloe Webb as Nancy Spungen. Oldman's performance was praised by Uncut as a "hugely sympathetic reading of the punk figurehead as a lost and bewildered manchild" though Oldman detested the film and punk music in general.

In 1993, Ade Edmondson played Vicious in The Comic Strip Presents: Demonella. In the film, which was directed by Paul Bartel, Vicious resides in Hell with Oscar Wilde, Adolf Hitler, Genghis Khan and Marie Antoinette.

The Foo Fighters' 1997 video for "Everlong" is about Sid and Nancy, with Sid defending Nancy against party demons. Dave Grohl and Taylor Hawkins play Sid and Nancy, respectively.

Love, Springfieldian Style, the Valentine's Day episode of The Simpsons 2008 season, spoofs Sid and Nancy's relationship.

In September 2009, the Roy Smiles play Kurt and Sid debuted at the Trafalgar Studios in London's West End. The play, set in Kurt Cobain's greenhouse on the day of his suicide, revolves around the ghost of Sid Vicious visiting Cobain to try and convince him not to kill himself. Vicious was played by Danny Dyer.

In January 2021, FX announced that a series about the Sex Pistols, called Pistol, had gone into production, with Vicious to be portrayed by Louis Partridge. It is based on Steve Jones' memoir Lonely Boy and is directed by Danny Boyle. Lydon called the series "The most disrespectful shit I've ever had to endure" and unsuccessfully sued to block the use of the Sex Pistols' music in the series.

Discography 

Solo
Sid Sings (1979) Virgin, Silver BPI
Sid Vicious, 1980, Innocent Records
Love Kills N.Y.C. (1985), Konexion
The Vicious White Kids (1986), DeLorean Records
Live At The Electric Ballroom London (1986), Konexion, MBC Records (re-released 2011)
The Real Sid and Nancy (1986), MBC Records
Battle of the Rockers, Sid Vicious V Eddie Cochran (1986), MBC Records
The Idols with Sid Vicious (1993), New Rose Records, Fan Club Records
The Best of Sid Vicious (1996), Overseas Records
Never Mind The Reunion Here's Sid Vicious (1997), Cleopatra Records
Sid Dead Live (1997), Anagram
Sid Vicious & Friends (1998, includes Sex Pistols tracks), Dressed to Kill
Better (To Provoke A Reaction Than To React To Provocation) (2001), Yeaah! Records, Anagram
Live at Max's Kansas City, NY 1978 (2002), Prism Leisure Corporation (re-released 2011)
Too Fast to Live (2004), Virgin, EMI
Search & Destroy (2004), Anarchy Music
Sid Lives (2007), Jungle Records
F#@k Off You C#%t (2008), Anarchy Music
Sid! By Those Who Really Knew Him (2009), ITN Source, Jungle Records
Very Vicious (2011), One Media Publishing
The Chaos and Disorder Tapes (2011), Landmark
The Sid Vicious Experience: Jack Boots & Dirty Looks (2014), Cleopatra
I'm A Mess (2015), Vinyl Lovers, DOL
Love Kills (2021), Anarchy Music

With the Sex Pistols
Never Mind the Bollocks, Here's the Sex Pistols (1977), Virgin (Platinum, No. 1)
The Great Rock 'n' Roll Swindle (1979), Virgin
Some Product: Carri on Sex Pistols (1979), Virgin
Flogging a Dead Horse (1980), Virgin
Pirates of Destiny (1989), Ball X
Kiss This (1992), Virgin
Anarchy in the U.S.A. (1992), MBC Records
Sid Vicious & Friends (1998), Dressed to Kill
Sex Pistols – Live! (2002), Eurotrend
The Filth and the Fury (2002), Virgin
Jubilee (2002), Virgin
Sex Pistols Box Set (2002), Virgin
 Punk Rockers (2003)

Film, video, television, documentaries 
Acceleration Punk (1977)
 Sex Pistols Number 1 (1977, directed by Derek Jarman)
Sex Pistols: Live in Stockholm 1977 (1977)
 Sex Pistols: Holidays in the Sun (1977)
 Sex Pistols: God Save the Queen (1977)
 Sex Pistols: Buried Alive (1978)
 Kill the Hippies (1978)
 My Way (1978)
The Punk Rock Movie from England (1978, directed by Don Letts. Original title: The Punk Rock Movie.)
 Sid Vicious: Something Else (1978, directed by Julien Temple)
Sid Vicious & Nancy Spungen (1979)
Top of the Pops (1979, Series episode 16.27)
 Mr. Mike's Mondo Video (1979, directed by Michael O'Donoghue)
 The Great Rock 'n' Roll Swindle (1980, directed by Julien Temple)
 British Rock: Punk and Its Aftershocks (1980) 
 D.O.A.: A Rite of Passage (1981, directed by Lech Kowalski)
 Decade...A Look Back (1989)
Rock & Roll (1995, Series episodes "Renegades" and "In the Groove")
 Classic Chaotic (1996)
Degeneration Punk (1997)
 Live at the Longhorn (1999)
Room 101 (1999, Series episode 4.1)
 The Filth and the Fury (2000, directed by Julien Temple)
 Live at Winterland (2001)
 24 Hour Party People (2002, directed by Michael Winterbottom)
Rage: 20 Years of Punk Rock West Coast Style (2001)
25 Years of Punk (2001)
 Sendung ohne Namen (2002, Series episode "Das Gute und das Böse!")
Hey! Is Dee Dee Home? (2002, directed by Lech Kowalski)
Classic Albums (2003, Series episode "Never Mind the Bollocks, Here's the Sex Pistols")
Mayor of the Sunset Strip (2003, directed by George Hickenlooper)
 Blood on the Turntable (2004, Series episode "The Sex Pistols")
John Lydon: The Best of British £1 Notes (2005)
 Music Box Biographical Collection: The Sex Pistols (2005)
Joy Division: Under Review (2006)
Final 24 (2006, Series episode "Sid Vicious")
 The Sex Pistols with Glen Matlock: Punk Icons (2006)
The Sex Pistols: In Their Own Words (2007)
NY77: The Coolest Year in Hell (2007, directed by Henry Corra)
Por Toda Minha Vida (2007, Series episode "Renato Russo")
 Chaos! Ex Pistols Secret History: The Dave Goodman Story (2007)
 Rock Case Studies: Sex Pistols (2007)
Chelsea on the Rocks (2008, directed by Abel Ferrara)
 There'll Always Be an England (2008, directed by Julien Temple)
Derek (2008, directed by Isaac Julien)
British Style Genius (2008, Series episode "Breaking the Rules: The Fashion Rebel Look")
 Who Killed Nancy? (2009, directed by Alan Parker)
 Sid! By Those That Really Knew Him (2009, directed by Mark Sloper)
Cuéntame (2010, Series Episode "Las dos comuniones de María Alcántara")
Whatever Happened to Pink Floyd? The Strange Case of Waters and Gilmour (2011)
Punk Britannia (2012, Series episode "Post-Punk 1978-1981")
Top of the Pops: The Story of 1977 (2012)
How the Brits Rocked America (2012, Series episode "We're the Kids in America")
Up Yours Ft. Feral Is Kinky: London (2013)
Basically, Johnny Moped (2013)
Christmas with the Sex Pistols (2013, directed by Julien Temple. Original title Never Mind the Baubles: Xmas '77 With The Sex Pistols)
Super Duper Alice Cooper (2014)
 Sad Vacation: The Last Days of Sid and Nancy (2016, directed by Daniel Garcia)
 Two Sevens Clash: Dread Meets Punk Rockers (2017, directed by Don Letts and Pablo D'Ambrosi)
 The Public Image is Rotten (2017)
 Here to Be Heard: The Story of The Slits (2017)
 Bad Reputation (2018) 
 The Go-Go's (2020)
 Blitzed! (2020)
 Rudi Backstage (2021, Series episode "Die größten Skandale der Popmusik II")

Additional Soundtrack Credits
Top of the Pops (1977, Series Episode 14.43)
South of Watford (1983, Series Episode "Positive Punk")
Fame (1987, Series Episode "Ian's Girl")
Goodfellas (1990, directed by Martin Scorsese)
Rodrigo D: No Future (1990, directed by Víctor Gaviria)
The Astronaut's Wife (1999, directed by Rand Ravich)
Performance and Cocktails: Live at Morfa Stadium (1999, Stereophonics)
On the Road (2003)
Punisher '79-'82) (2010)
Juan of the Dead (2011, directed by Alejandro Brugués)
Californication (2014, Series Episode "Smile", directed by John Dahl)
Gotham (2016, Series Episode "Wrath of the Villains: Pinewood")
Dare to Be Different(2017)
Natsuki: The Movie (2018, directed by Chris Broad)
Hits, Hype & Hustle: An Insider's Guide to the Music Business (2018, Series Episode "Revivals and Reunions")
Professor Rex Sings Every Song Ever! (2020, Series Episode 5: "Sex Pistols")

Radio and interviews

Cult Heroes, Sid Vicious/Elvis Presley, was released in 1993 by BBC Transcripton Services. It is an in-depth profile of Vicious intercut with interviews and music, presented by Magenta Devine.
Sid Vicious – Probably His Last Ever Interview (2000), Ozit-Morpheus Records
In Search of Sid, a 30-minute radio documentary about Sid Vicious recorded by Jah Wobble, was aired on the BBC Radio 4 on 20 January 2009.

References

Further reading 
 Anne Beverley, The Sid Vicious Family album (1980, Virgin Books) 
 Gerald Cole, Sid and Nancy (1986, Methuen) 
 Alex Cox & Abbe Wool, Sid and Nancy (1986, Faber and Faber) 
 Keith Bateson and Alan Parker, Sid's Way (1991, Omnibus Press) 
 Tom Stockdale, Sid Vicious. They Died Too Young (1995, Parragon) 
 Deborah Spungen, And I Don't Want to Live This Life (1996, Ballantine Books) 
 Malcolm Butt, Sid Vicious. Rock'n'Roll Star (1997, Plexus) 
 David Dalton, El Sid (1998, St. Martin's Griffin) 
 Sid Vicious, Too Fast To Live...Too Young to Die (1999, Retro Publishing)
 Julien Temple, The Filth and The Fury (2000, St. Martin's Press) 
 Alan Parker, Vicious. Too Fast To Live... (2004, Creation Books) 
 Ed Hamilton, "Legends of the Chelsea Hotel: Living with the Artists and Outlaws of New York's Rebel Mecca" (2007, DeCapo Press) 
 Alan Parker (foreword by Malcolm McLaren), No One Is Innocent (Orion Books 2008) 
 Jeremy Simmonds, The Encyclopedia of Dead Rock Stars: Heroin, Handguns and Ham Sandwiches (2008, Chicago Review Press) 
 Glen Matlock, I Was a Teenage Sex Pistol (2012, Rocket 88) 
 Teddie Dahlin, A Vicious Love Story: Remembering the Real Sid Vicious (2013, New Haven Publishing) 
 John Lydon, Anger Is An Energy: My Life Uncensored (2014, Simon & Schuster) 
 Bengt-Erik Larsson, What Happened In Room 100 at Chelsea Hotel? The Death of Nancy Spungen and Sid Vicious (Musical Memorials in New York) Kindle edition, 2015.

External links 

Sid Vicious at MySpace
Vicious' confession to the NYPD and other documents
Sid Vicious day-by-day timeline
Birth and death of Sid Vicious 

1957 births
1979 deaths
Criminals from London
Deaths by heroin overdose in New York (state)
Drug-related deaths in New York City
English expatriates in Spain
English expatriates in the United States
English people of Scottish descent
English punk rock bass guitarists
Sex Pistols members
Siouxsie and the Banshees members
20th-century squatters
Musicians from London
Musicians from Royal Tunbridge Wells
Virgin Records artists
Male bass guitarists
20th-century English bass guitarists